Aslı Orcan (born 27 May 1980) is a Turkish actress and dancer. She graduated from Turkish Folk Dancing at the State Conservatoire of Ege University in İzmir, Turkey. She married Yetkin Dikinciler in 2014.

Filmography
 Sır Kapısı / Sırlar Dünyası (2002)
 Hekimoğlu (2003) 
 Burçak Tarlası (2004)
 Çapkın (2005) 
 Sensiz Olmuyor (2005) 
 Kaybolan Yıllar (2006) – Yasemin
 İki Yabancı (2007) – Rana
 Yemin (2007) – Yeşim 
 Ateş ve Barut (2008) – Yonca
 Cam Kırıkları (2009) – Emel
 Aile Saadeti (2009)
 Karadayı (2012–2013) – Serra Aşık
 Kurt Seyit ve Şura (2014) – Baroness Lola
 Medcezir (2014–2015) – Deniz
 Bana Sevmeyi Anlat (2016) – Berna
 Kara Yazı – Elif
 Kahraman Babam (2021) – Ayşe
 Sadakatsiz (2021–2022) – Leyla Ateşoğlu
 Darmaduman (2022) –

References

1980 births
Living people
Turkish film actresses
Turkish television actresses
People from Aydın